Tikobo No.1 (or, in short form Tikwabo) is a town in the Western region of Ghana.  It is in the Jomoro District.  The main occupation of the inhabitants of the town is cocoa farming. The town has a sister town called Tikobo No.2.

References

Populated places in the Western Region (Ghana)